Mark Wilson is an Australian professional ballroom dancer and former dance teacher. He is a television personality, best known for being an original judge on the reality TV show Dancing with the Stars (on the Seven Network) appearing for the first ten seasons. In 2021, he returned as a judge with other former original judges Paul Mercurio, Todd McKenney and Helen Richey, along with original host Daryl Somers.

Biography
Wilson has been crowned Australian Dancesport Champion on five occasions – four times in New Vogue and once in Modern. He has competed throughout the UK, Europe and Japan. On two occasions he came 15th in the World Dancesport Championship finals: once at Blackpool Tower in 1989 and again in Tokyo in 1990. Mark has also appeared in popular ABC TV show That's Dancin', winning the professional series.

Wilson has been a judge on other various dance shows, such as Tattersalls Australian Dancesport Championship. He coaches new judges and acts as a junior development officer for Dancesport Victoria and its school dance programs. He teaches students of all ages at his own studio, from beginners to medalists and competition couples.

He was a contestant on another Australian reality TV show It Takes Two, which also airs on the Seven Network.

References

Australian ballroom dancers
Australian male dancers
Dance teachers
Living people
Place of birth missing (living people)
Dancing with the Stars (Australian TV series)
21st-century Australian dancers
1962 births